Columbia Turnpike may refer to:

Columbia Turnpike (Connecticut), now mainly Route 66
Columbia Turnpike (New York)
Columbia Turnpike (Washington), now Bladensburg Road, and the original operator of Virginia's Columbia Pike in Arlington County

See also
Columbia Pike (disambiguation)